Single Bullet Theory was an American new wave band from Richmond, Virginia.

History
The band was founded in 1976 under the name X-Breed; the new moniker was adopted after the addition of a guitarist and bassist to the original three-person lineup. They self-released an EP in 1977 and by 1979 were opening for Patti Smith. After landing a song on the Asylum Sharp Cuts compilation album, they signed with Mike Curb Productions, but left the label before releasing any material. In 1982, they signed to CBS Records subsidiary Nemperor and released a full-length album. The single "Keep It Tight" appeared on MTV and reached No. 78 on the Billboard Hot 100. A second single, "Hang On to Your Heart" was test marketed in the United States Virgin Islands and reached No. 1 but CBS pulled all promotion on the band; the single was never released and the group disbanded shortly after.

Members
Michael Maurice Garrett - vocals, saxophone, guitar
Frank Daniel - guitar, bass
Dennis Madigan - drums
Gary Alan Holmes - guitar
Michael Muller - bass - vocals
Barry Fitzgerald - keyboards
Davey Wynn - bass
Mudd Herman - guitar
Keith MacPhee - bass
Mark Lewis - guitar
Band members changed over the years; the final line-up included Garrett/Madigan/Holmes/Muller and Fitzgerald.

Discography
Single Bullet Theory EP (Self-released, 1977)
Single Bullet Theory LP (Nemperor, 1982)
SBT: 1977-1980 Download Compilation (Free Music Archive, 2010)
Complete Discography Single Bullet Theory Discography

References

American new wave musical groups
Rock music groups from Virginia
Musical groups established in 1976
Musical groups disestablished in 1982